The SRCM Mod. 35 is a hand grenade that was first issued to the Royal Italian Army in 1935, serving through World War II and into the 1980s. Nicknamed "Red Devils" by the British in 1941–1942 during the North African Campaign after the red color of the most common type.

Description 
Entered into service in 1935, the SRCM Mod. 35, together with the OTO Mod. 35 and the Breda Mod. 35 represented the new generation of hand grenades with which the Royal Italian Army faced World War II. After the Armistice of Cassibile it was adopted as Handgranate 328 by the German forces in Italy. It was used by the Italian Army until the late 1980s, and the armed forces of Malta (supplied by MIATM).

The SRCM Mod. 35 is an offensive-type hand grenade meaning that it scatters light shrapnel, lethal within a radius of less than the maximum distance of the throw, its purpose being to cover the advance of the thrower without the thrower having to seek cover. Typical throwing range is 20–25 meters and the effective range of the shrapnel 10–15 meters. The outer shell of the grenade is aluminium, containing 43 grams of TNT and dinitronaphthalene with an internal wire wrapped around it that turns into shrapnel at the time of the explosion. It has two safeties, a manual one consisting of a crossbar with brass handle and an automatic one, consisting by a cross bar of aluminium connected to an external handle.

During the war the SRCM were also used as anti-personnel mines with appropriate modifications. Mounted without the safety, inside a tubular structure with a protruding pin that worked as striker. When stepped on the striker depressed into the tube hitting the grenade fuze.

Issues 
In the SCRM 35 Italian ordnance designers created a compact grenade that was designed to explode on impact, but it also gained a reputation for being spectacularly dangerous. The Red Devil earned its nickname for two reasons- the Italian ordnance color code for High Explosive was red and when Allies found the grenades unexploded, they sometimes had the habit of going off after the fact.

The Red Devil was activated by yanking on a rubber tab that freed a safety ring. Once hurled into the air, a safety cap partially encasing the brightly painted aluminium body, disengaged and partially armed the grenade. A small chain inside the cap acted as a second safety, pulling away and preparing the grenade for detonation.

Unlike almost all other grenades of the 20th century, the Red Devil did not use a timed chemical reaction to ignite the explosive filler. The grenade, once its safety disengaged, would explode on impact.

The Red Devil had a small shutter built into the case. Only when the grenade struck a surface with sufficient force would the shutter move, allowing a striker inside the grenade to ignite the explosive filler. The Red Devil was designed to explode, sending shrapnel out, no matter how the grenade landed.

While the safeties proved reliable, there were always problems with the grenade remaining unexploded. In North Africa, British forces during World War II would find these red-painted hand grenades undetonated. And, on occasion, when a grenade was picked back up the striker would engage and detonate.

Versions 
Post-war produced grenades were painted a khaki color and using the same colored lines scheme for the various versions.

See also 

 Breda Mod.35
 OTO Mod 35
 Granata OD 82/SE
 Esercito Italiano

Notes

Bibliography 
 Istruzione Sulla Bomba a Mano S.R.C.M Mod. 35 ad effetto ridotto, Stato Maggiore Esercito, 1972
 Le armi e le artiglierie in servizio di F. Grandi, ", 1938

World War II infantry weapons of Italy
Grenades of Italy
Fragmentation grenades